Saint-Jean-de-Luz-Ciboure is a railway station in Saint-Jean-de-Luz and across the river from Ciboure, Nouvelle-Aquitaine, France. The station is located on the Bordeaux–Irun railway line. The station is served by TGV (high speed trains), Intercités de Nuit (night trains), Intercités (long distance) and TER (local) services operated by the SNCF.

Train services
The following services currently call at Saint-Jean-de-Luz-Ciboure:
high speed services (TGV) Paris - Bordeaux - Irun
intercity services (Intercités) Hendaye - Bayonne - Pau - Tarbes - Toulouse
local service (TER Nouvelle-Aquitaine) Bordeaux - Dax - Bayonne - Hendaye

References

Railway stations in Pyrénées-Atlantiques